Maurice Peoples (born December 17, 1950) is an American former sprinter.

Biography
He was two time American champion in the 400 metres.

He also had the dubious distinction of being selected to the 1972 United States Olympic Team as one of the six members of the 4x400 metres relay team, but never getting onto the track as three of his teammates were unable to compete: gold and silver  medalists Vince Matthews and Wayne Collett were sent home by a sensitive International Olympic Committee after they appeared inattentive at the medal ceremony, while John Smith had pulled his hamstring while leading 80 meters into the 400 metres final and had been ruled unfit to run.

Peoples went to G. A. R. Memorial Junior Senior High School in Wilkes-Barre, Pennsylvania, where he was the 1968 and 1969 state champion in the Triple jump, coached by longtime coach Vince Wojnar.  Peoples next went to Arizona State University where he is still ranked second in the 400m on their all-time list, behind 1968 Olympian Ron Freeman.

Peoples is an ordained minister and coached for 35 years.  He is one of the authors of Sprint Secrets

References

1950 births
Living people
American male sprinters
Athletes (track and field) at the 1972 Summer Olympics
Athletes (track and field) at the 1975 Pan American Games
Athletes (track and field) at the 1979 Pan American Games
Pan American Games gold medalists for the United States
Pan American Games medalists in athletics (track and field)
Olympic track and field athletes of the United States
Medalists at the 1975 Pan American Games
Medalists at the 1979 Pan American Games